Farmers' Folly may refer to:

The Tenantry Column in Alnwick, England, which was built by local farmers
Penshaw Monument in Sunderland, England, which an apocryphal story says was built by local farmers